Hot Lake may refer to:
 Hot Lake (Humboldt County, Nevada)
 Hot Lake, Oregon, an unincorporated community in Union County, Oregon
 Hot Lake (Washington), a lake in Okanogan County, Washington
 Hot Lake (Wyoming), a lake in Yellowstone National Park in Wyoming
 Hot Lake District, former name for an area of geothermal activity in New Zealand

See also
Hot spring